Troll-elgen (The Troll Moose or The Magic Moose) is a Norwegian silent film from 1927. It is based on the novels Troll-elgen and Skoggangsmand by Mikkjel Fønhus. The film was directed by Walter Fürst, and it stars Tryggve Larssen as Sjur Renna.

Censorship
The censors felt that a fight scene between Hans and Gunnar in the film, another violent scene, and intertitles reading Men slegtningen villde ikke være hjelpsom for ingenting 'But the relative didn't want to help with anything', when the sleazy uncle from Oslo tries to have his way with Ingrid, and Denne gang skal du være jenta mi enten du vil eller ikke 'This time you will be my girl whether you want to or not', when Gunnar forces himself on Ingrid, were too strong for the Norwegian public, and these were cut.

Cast

 Tryggve Larssen as Sjur Renna 'Gaupa'
 Bengt Djurberg as Hans Trefothaugen
 Julie Lampe as Turi Trefothaugen, Hans's mother
 Tove Tellback as Ingrid Rustebakke
 Harald Stormoen as Hallstein Rustebakke, a wealthy farmer
 Einar Tveito as Gunnar Sløvika, a horse dealer
 Egil Hjorth-Jenssen as Tølleiv, a servant boy at the Rustbakke farm
 Mimi Kihle as Bellina, a dancer
 Hauk Aabel as Piper, a manager
 Nils Ahrén as P. Rustebakke, a rich relative

References

External links
 
 Troll-elgen at the National Library of Norway
 Troll-elgen at Filmfront
 Troll-elgen at the Swedish Film Database

1927 films
Norwegian black-and-white films
Norwegian drama films
Norwegian silent films